The Boar's Head Inn was an inn at Southwark in London, owned by Sir John Fastolf, who is the source for the character-name of Falstaff. While the Eastcheap Boar's Head Inn is not known to have existed during the reign of Henry IV, this inn may have.

References

Demolished buildings and structures in London
Former buildings and structures in the London Borough of Southwark
Pubs in the London Borough of Southwark
Former pubs in London